Nader Davoodi (born 9 January 1963) is an Iranian photojournalist. For the past two decades, he has been working to produce ethnographically detailed works that document a very important period in contemporary Iranian history. He is the first Iranian sport photographer to cover the FIFA World Cup (USA 1994) and his photo of  Yordan Lechkov's goal against Germany won him the best sport picture of the year award in the annual Iranian sport's photo contest.

Career
His coverage of the 12th Asian Games (Hiroshima 1994) is a precious collection of the games & sidelines of the most important Asian sport event, while the 1994, 1998 & 2006 World Cups in the US, France & Germany were covered as the most important international sport occasions. In 2000, he covered the Sydney Olympic Games which resulted in publishing a book entitled Sydney 2000. The book includes the most amazing sidelines covering different nationalities in exceptional moments of happiness & passion. 
He is a founding member of The International Soccer Cartoon Contest, which was held in 1999 for the first time.

He is one of the first Iranian photographers to have an exhibition in the month of photography in Toronto (Contact 2005 ), with the title Breaking the Rules at the University of Toronto. Currently residing in Toronto, Ontario, he is a Founding Member of the Iranian Photojournalists Association (1998) and one of the first to create an all English photoblog on Iran (July 2005). He is the publisher of Tamashagaran Weekly.

He has published four books titled Iran on its way to the World Cup, A simple Event, Iranian Artifacts in the Metropolitan Museum of Art, and Sydney 2000 as both writer and editor. His documentary, 13 and a Half, co-directed with Abbas Ahmadi, was premiered on October 1, 2006, at the 25th Vancouver International Film Festival.

See also
 Culture of Iran
 Islamic art
 Iranian art
 Iranian art and architecture
 List of Iranian artists

References

External links
Nader Davoodi's Collection

Iranian photojournalists
Sports photographers
1963 births
Living people